In law, merits are the inherent rights and wrongs of a legal case, absent of any emotional or technical bias. The evidence is applied solely to cases decided on its merits, and any procedural matters are discounted.

The term comes from Old French merite, meaning "reward" or "moral worth".

External links

 Definition from Merriam-Webster.com

Legal terminology